Ziesite is a copper vanadate mineral with formula: β-Cu2V2O7.  It was discovered in 1980 as monoclinic crystals occurring as volcanic sublimates around fumaroles in the crater of the Izalco Volcano, El Salvador.  It is named after Emanuel George Zies (1883–1981), an American geochemist who studied Izalco in the 1930s.

Closely related is blossite, also a copper vanadate with formula of α-Cu2V2O7.  It forms orthorhombic crystals.  Blossite was also first described for specimens from the Izalco volcano.

Ziesite and blossite are polymorphs, different crystal structure for the same chemical composition and are quite similar in physical properties. 

Associated minerals include stoiberite, shcherbinaite, bannermanite, fingerite, mcbirneyite, blossite, chalcocyanite and chalcanthite.

References

Copper(II) minerals
Vanadate minerals
Monoclinic minerals
Minerals in space group 15